Elaeocarpus gaussenii is a critically endangered species of flowering plant in the Elaeocarpaceae family. It is found only in the Western Ghats of Tamil Nadu, India. It is threatened by habitat loss.

References

gaussenii
Flora of Tamil Nadu
Critically endangered plants
Taxonomy articles created by Polbot